Ville Hautala (born 19 November 1968) is a Finnish middle-distance runner. He competed in the men's 3000 metres steeplechase at the 1992 Summer Olympics.

References

1968 births
Living people
Athletes (track and field) at the 1992 Summer Olympics
Finnish male middle-distance runners
Finnish male steeplechase runners
Olympic athletes of Finland
Place of birth missing (living people)